Jászboldogháza is a village in Jász-Nagykun-Szolnok county, in the Northern Great Plain region of central Hungary.

Geography
The village is around 70 km east of Budapest.

References

External links
 Official site in Hungarian

Populated places in Jász-Nagykun-Szolnok County
Jászság